Came a Long Way is the tenth full-length album released by Haystak on July 21, 2009. It was Haystak's second album of 2009. The album peaked at 39 on the Billboard 200 R&B/Hip Hop Albums, 22 on the Heakseekers Albums, and 16 on the Rap Albums.

Track listing

 "Come So Hard" - 5:20
 "I Am Legend" - 4:16
 "The Hatred Is High" - 4:12
 "I Am That White Boy" - 5:14
 "Village Idiot" - 4:13
 "Keep Playin!!!" - 4:31
 "What's Work" - 4:08
 "Pavarotti" - 3:26
 "Relevant" - 4:40
 "White Boys" - 3:59
 "Outta Town" (interlude) - 0:32
 "Varoom" - 4:19
 "Waiting For You" - 4:44
 "Gone For So Long" - 4:51
 "David & Goliath" - 5:49
 "Bitch" - 3:40
 "Paper Boy" - 5:10
 "Killers" - 5:05

References 

Haystak albums
2009 albums